"Knowledge" is a song by American band Operation Ivy. It was written by lead vocalist Jesse Michaels and appeared on the album Energy.

During the opening of the song at Operation Ivy's last show at Gilman St. (which was released on the "Lint Rides Again" bootleg), Michaels opens the song by saying that "this song is called 'Knowledge', and it's about growing up."

Popularity and covers

 The song is one of the most popular songs by Operation Ivy, and has been covered by many artists, including a notable cover by fellow Berkeley musical trio Green Day on their EP Slappy (also featured on the compilation album 1,039/Smoothed Out Slappy Hours). When Green Day performs the song live, fans are invited to come on-stage and play instruments. On the  Green Day version there is a hidden message when played backwards at the beginning which says "I'm a very stupid person"
 The Aquabats recorded a cover for the Operation Ivy tribute album Take Warning: Songs of Operation Ivy.
 The Menzingers covered the song, as well as Rancid's Roots Radicals on December 27, 2012 during a secret show at The Asbury Lanes.
 A Millencolin cover of the song is available on their compilation The Melancholy Collection.
 Even in Blackouts recorded a version of the song for their album Myths & Imaginary Magicians.
 Evergreen Terrace recorded a version of the song for their cover album Writer's Block.
 The Static Locals have also covered Knowledge, it was also the first thing they have ever recorded.
 Although they have never officially covered it, Rancid, the later band of Operation Ivy guitarist Tim Armstrong and bassist Matt Freeman, often play this song live.
 Machine Gun Kelly used a lyric from Knowledge on his song "All I Know," released on his 2020 album Tickets To My Downfall. Jesse Michaels confirmed on his Instagram that the members of Operation Ivy had licensed the lyric to Machine Gun Kelly.

Personnel
Tim Armstrong - guitars, background vocals
Jesse Michaels - lyrics, lead vocals
Dave Mello - drums, background vocals
Matt McCall - bass, background vocals

References

Hardcore punk songs
1989 songs
Operation Ivy (band)
Green Day songs
Ska punk songs